Lake Poncheville is a freshwater body in of Eeyou Istchee Baie-James (municipality), in the administrative region of Nord-du-Québec, in the province of Quebec, in Canada. The southern part of the lake is part of the townships of Des Combes and Grandfontaine.

Forestry is the main economic activity of the sector. In addition, the Quénonisca Lake (located to the north) of a length of  offers another navigable body of water that connects to the Broadback River.

The Poncheville Lake watershed is accessible via a forest road (east-west direction) from the west connecting the road to the north.

The surface of Poncheville Lake is usually frozen from early November to mid-May, however, safe ice circulation is generally from mid-November to mid-April.

Geography

Toponymy

Notes and references

See also 

Eeyou Istchee James Bay
Lakes of Nord-du-Québec
Nottaway River drainage basin